Ronald John Lolich (born September 19, 1946) is an American former professional baseball right fielder. He played in Major League Baseball (MLB) for the Chicago White Sox in 1971 and the Cleveland Indians from 1972 to 1973. The cousin of Major League pitcher Mickey Lolich, Ron had a nine-year professional career.

Lolich was an accomplished minor league hitter — batting .281 in 745 games (his best season, 1972, coming with his hometown Portland Beavers of the Pacific Coast League) — but he collected only 48 Major League hits in 87 games played. With only 4 all-time MLB home runs, Ron is on the very short list of MLB players who have hit a walk-off grand slam home run when trailing by exactly 3 runs. He accomplished the feat on April 22, 1973 to give the Indians an 8-7 win over the Boston Red Sox.

External links

1946 births
Living people
Major League Baseball right fielders
Chicago White Sox players
Cleveland Indians players
Evansville White Sox players
Fox Cities Foxes players
Florida Rookie League White Sox players
Lynchburg White Sox players
Oklahoma City 89ers players
Tucson Toros players
Portland Beavers players
Baseball players from Oregon
Baseball players from Portland, Oregon